The Escape is a 2009 Danish drama film directed by Kathrine Windfeld.

Cast 
 Iben Hjejle - Rikke Lyngvig
 Lars Mikkelsen - Thomas Jargil
 Henrik Prip - Arne Hansen
 Sonja Richter - Sara Jargil
 Vibeke Hastrup - Hanne Hvidtfeldt
 Søren Spanning - Jesper Bech
 Mikael Birkkjær - Claes Kielland
 Søren Sætter-Lassen - Steffensen
 Faegh Zamani - Nazir Osmani

References

External links 

2009 drama films
2009 films
Danish drama films
2000s Danish-language films